Grace Macintyre is an Australian soccer player who last played as a defender for the Newcastle Jets in the Australian W-league.

Club career
Macintyre started playing soccer at the age of 6 with the local club Kotara Bears. Six years later she joined Newcastle Jets' Emerging Jets program. In 2012, she debuted in the W-League for the Newcastle Jets senior team at the age of 16.

Macintyre missed the 2015–16 W-League season due to injury. Upon her return to play during the first round of the 2016–17 W-League season, she switched from playing as an attacker to playing as a defender, tagging Melbourne City's left-back Steph Catley, performing very well to draw praise from her coach, Craig Deans. Despite her great performances over the season, following a knee reconstruction, Macintyre didn't re-sign with the Newcastle Jets.

As well as playing at the senior level, Macintyre also represented Merewether United of the Women's Premier League during the 2017 season.

International career
Macintyre was selected in 2009 by the Australian under-14 team, firstly as part of a training camp at the Australian Institute of Sport in Canberra, and subsequently as part of the squad selected to play in the Asian Football Confederation Under-14 Girls Festival of Football in Ho Chi Minh City in Vietnam. In 2011, she was selected by the Australian under-17 team for their New Zealand tour. Two years later she was selected by the Australian under-20 team to participate in the 2013 AFC U-19 Women's Championship in China. She started one game in the tournament, in Australia's only victory, which was against Myanmar.

Style of play
Macintyre started out playing as a forward and later converted to a defender position. She is a versatile player, who controls one-on-one situations and has a powerful shot.

Personal life
Macintyre studied occupational therapy at the University of Newcastle, while working as a nanny and a support worker.

References

Living people
Australian women's soccer players
Newcastle Jets FC (A-League Women) players
A-League Women players
Women's association football forwards
1996 births